Gadala is a part of Rajahmundry Municipal Corporation in East Godavari district of the Indian state of Andhra Pradesh. It was merged into the corporation on 18 March 2013, alongside 21 panchayats.

References

Rajahmundry